Cambe may refer to:
 Cambé, Brazil
 Cambe (Cappadocia), Turkey